The 50th ISSF World Shooting Championships was held in Munich, Germany from July 29, 2010, to August 10, 2010.

Rifle events

Men

Women

Pistol events

Men

Women

Shotgun events

Men

Women

Running target events

Men

Women

World records

Medal count

External links 
 Official site

ISSF World Shooting Championships
ISSF
ISSF
2010 in German sport
2010s in Munich
Sports competitions in Munich
Shooting competitions in Germany